Shmidel is a surname of German or Yiddish origin.

Notable people
 Dovid Shmidel (born 1934), rabbi and the chairman of Asra Kadisha
 Felix Shmidel (born 1955), Israeli social psychologist, anthropologist, chemical engineer, and methodologist

German-language surnames
Yiddish-language surnames